Paul Marie Alfred Lebeau (19 December 1868 – 18 November 1959) was a French chemist. He studied at the elite École supérieure de physique et de chimie industrielles de la ville de Paris (ESPCI). Together with his doctoral advisor Henri Moissan he was working on fluorine chemistry discovering several new compounds, like bromine trifluoride, oxygen difluoride, selenium tetrafluoride and sulfur hexafluoride.
 
In 1899 he was able to obtain pure beryllium by electrolysis  sodium fluoroberyllate (Na2[BeF2]). 

In World War I he improved the gas mask design used by the French army.

References

1868 births
1959 deaths
20th-century French chemists
ESPCI Paris alumni
Commandeurs of the Légion d'honneur
Members of the French Academy of Sciences